

League standings

Bohuslän/Dalsland

References 

8
Swedish Football Division 4 seasons